Cart Blocks is a food cart pod in Portland, Oregon's Ankeny Square, in the United States. The pod opened in 2021, following closure of the Alder Street food cart pod in 2019. The city hosted a ribbon-cutting ceremony to commemorate the pod's opening.

References

External links
 

2021 establishments in Oregon
Food carts in Portland, Oregon
Southwest Portland, Oregon